C20 or C-20 may refer to:

Science and technology
 Carbon-20 (C-20 or 20C), an isotope of carbon
 C20, the smallest possible fullerene (a carbon molecule)
 C20 (engineering), a mix of concrete that has a compressive strength of 20 newtons per square millimeter
 Malignant neoplasm of rectum, a type of colorectal cancer (ICD-10 code: C20)
 Caldwell 20 or North America Nebula, an emission nebula in the constellation Cygnus
 IEC 60320 C20, a polarised, three pole socket electrical connector
 C20 (Capacity, 20 hours), C100 (100 hours), battery capacity

Transportation and military
 Colt Canada C20 DMR, a Canadian designated marksman rifle
 , a 1910 British C-class submarine
 Sauber C20, a 2001 racing car
 SL C20, a type of rolling stock used in the Stockholm metro
 , a cruiser of the Royal Navy
 C-20, the proposed in-service designation of the Fokker F-32
 C-20A/B/C/D/E, variants of the Gulfstream III
 C-20F/G/H/J, variants of the Gulfstream IV

Other uses
 Bill C-20, the Canadian Clarity Act
 OMX Copenhagen 20, Denmark's primary stock market index
 King's Pawn Game, a chess opening (Encyclopaedia of Chess Openings code: C20)
 The Twentieth Century Society, a British charity which campaigns for the preservation of architectural heritage from 1914 onwards
 C20 Cities, now expanded to the C40 Cities Climate Leadership Group

See also
 20th century